INTERMIX is a curated, omni-channel women's fashion retailer.

INTERMIX was founded in 1993 by Khajak and Haro Keledjian. It was sold to Gap Inc. for $130 million in 2012. On May 21, 2021, INTERMIX was acquired by Altamont Capital Partners, a private equity firm.

The brand has curated and edited styles from a mix of designers such as Isabel Marant, Balmain, Ulla Johnson, Zimmermann, AGOLDE, Sika, Acne, and Nanushka. The brand's own collection, the INTERMIX Collection, is designed in-house.

A third of its assortment is exclusive to the brand.

References

Gap brands
Clothing companies of the United States
Clothing companies established in 1993